General Nathaniel Stevenson (1840–1911) was a British Army officer who became Lieutenant Governor of Guernsey.

Military career
Stevenson was commissioned as an ensign in the 1st Regiment of Foot in 1858. In 1863 he was transferred to the 87th Regiment of Foot. He was appointed assistant adjutant and quartermaster-general for Cork District in 1880 and then, having served as Assistant-Adjutant and Quartermaster-General on the Staff, he was appointed Deputy Adjutant-General in Ireland in 1884. He was appointed General Officer Commanding Northern District in 1889, General Officer Commanding North Eastern District later in the year and Lieutenant Governor of Guernsey in 1894. It was in that capacity that he went to Westminster Abbey in 1898 to attend former Prime Minister Gladstone's funeral.

He was appointed Colonel of the Royal Inniskilling Fusiliers on 8 March 1902.

References

 

|-
 

|-
|-

|-

1840 births
1911 deaths
British Army generals
Royal Scots officers
87th (Royal Irish Fusiliers) Regiment of Foot officers